This is the discography of British singer Barry Ryan, as a solo artist and with his brother Paul Ryan.

Albums

Studio albums

Compilation albums

Singles

References

Discographies of British artists
Pop music discographies
Rock music discographies